Dicyclohexylurea is an organic compound, specifically, a urea. It is the byproduct of the reaction of dicyclohexylcarbodiimide with amines or alcohols. It may be prepared by the reaction of cyclohexylamine and S,S-dimethyl dithiocarbonate.
1,3-Dicyclohexyl urea (DCU) is a potent soluble epoxide hydrolase (sEH) inhibitor. It has been shown to lower systemic blood pressure by 22 ± 4 mmHg in SHR.

References

Ureas